The Harbour Main Group is a group of Neoproterozoic volcanic rocks cropping out in Newfoundland.

Neoproterozoic Newfoundland and Labrador